Coelolepidae is an extinct family of thelodont vertebrate agnathans that lived during the Silurian.

References

External links 
 

Thelodonti
Prehistoric jawless fish families
Silurian jawless fish